Hamshire-Fannett Independent School District is a public school district based in unincorporated Jefferson County, Texas, United States.

It serves Hamshire, Fannett, and New Holland.

History
The district was formed in 1961 by the consolidation of Hamshire-New Holland I.S.D. and Fannett I.S.D.

In addition to Hamshire, the district also serves city of Taylor Landing as well as the unincorporated communities of Fannett, LaBelle, and Cheek.

On February 13, 1964, the Board of Trustees approved a plan for desegregating Hamshire-Fannett ISD:

WHEREAS, the Board of Trustees and the administration have carefully studied and considered the ways and means to desegregate its schools consistent with the decision of the United States Supreme Court in Brown vs. Board of Education [347 U.S. 483, 74 S.Ct. 686, 98 L.Ed. 873, 349 U.S. 294, 75 S.Ct. 753, 99 L.Ed. 1083], which provides that various local school problems may be taken into consideration in arriving at a fair and feasible plan to bring about desegregation; and

WHEREAS, the Board of Trustees and the administration have considered these local problems; and,

WHEREAS, we believe the following plan is fair to all of the children in the District and that it is best, under all attendant circumstances which are present, for this School District:

NOW, THEREFORE, BE IT RESOLVED that the following plan of desegregation be adopted by the Board of Trustees of the Hamshire-Fannett Independent School District of Jefferson County, Texas: Those qualified to attend the schools and receive instruction in the Hamshire-Fannett Independent School District in the first grade for the school year 1964-65 shall be admitted to the school nearest their residence regardless of race or color. Thereafter, the second grade through the twelfth grade shall be desegregated in succession on a grade-a-year basis during the next eleven years following the school year 1964-65 (at which time the first grade is to be desegregated under this plan).

ADOPTED AND APPROVED this 13th day of February, 1964. Signed: Rodney Christ, President, Board of Trustees, Hamshire-Fannett Independent School District

In 2010, the school district was rated "exemplary" by the Texas Education Agency.

Schools
Hamshire-Fannett High School (Grades 9-12)
Hamshire-Fannett Middle (Grades 6-8)
Hamshire-Fannett Intermediate (Grades 4-5)
Hamshire-Fannett Elementary (Grades PK-3)

References

External links
Hamshire-Fannett ISD

School districts in Jefferson County, Texas
School districts established in 1961
1961 establishments in Texas